The Tide may refer to:

The Tide light rail, a transit system in Norfolk, Virginia
The Tide (Lucy Kaplansky album), 1994, or the title track
The Tide (Nigeria), newspaper in Port Harcourt, Rivers State
The Tide (Oceana album), 2008, or the title track
The Tide (band), a band formed in 2015
"The Tide", a song by Squarepusher from his 1999 album Budakhan Mindphone
"The Tide", a song by Niall Horan from his 2017 album Flicker

See also
Tide (disambiguation)